Henry Percy, 1st Earl of Northumberland, 4th Baron Percy, titular King of Mann, KG, Lord Marshal (10 November 134120 February 1408) was the son of Henry de Percy, 3rd Baron Percy, and a descendant of Henry III of England. His mother was Mary of Lancaster, daughter of Henry, 3rd Earl of Lancaster, son of Edmund, Earl of Leicester and Lancaster, who was the son of Henry III.

Life

Henry Percy was originally a follower of Edward III of England, for whom he held high offices in the administration of northern England. At a young age, he was made Warden of the Marches towards Scotland in 1362, with the authority to negotiate with the Scottish government. In February 1367, he was entrusted with the supervision of all castles and fortified places in the Scottish marches. He went on to support King Richard II, was formally created an Earl on Richard's coronation in 1377, and was briefly given the title of Marshal of England. Between 1383 and 1384, he was appointed Admiral of the Northern Seas. After Richard elevated his rival Ralph Neville to the position of Earl of Westmorland in 1397, Percy and his son, also Henry and known as "Hotspur", supported the rebellion of Henry Bolingbroke, who became King as Henry IV.

On King Henry IV's coronation, Henry Percy was appointed Constable of England and granted the lordship of the Isle of Man. Percy and Hotspur were given the task of subduing the rebellion of Owain Glyndŵr, but their attempts to make peace with the Welsh rebels did not meet with the king's approval.

Rebellion
In September 1402 the Percys took part in the Battle of Homildon Hill, which led to the capture of many Scots nobles. Henry did not want them to be ransomed, leading to another quarrel.
In 1403 the Percys turned against Henry IV in favour of Edmund Mortimer, 5th Earl of March, and then conspired with Owain Glyndŵr against Henry. The Percy rebellion failed at the Battle of Shrewsbury, where Hotspur was killed.  Since the earl did not directly participate in the rebellion, he was not convicted of treason. However, he lost his office as Constable.

In 1405 all three parties signed the Tripartite Indenture, which divided England up between them. Glyndŵr was to be given Wales, and a substantial part of the west of England, Northumberland was to have received the north of England, as well as Northamptonshire, Norfolk, Warwickshire, and Leicestershire. The Mortimers were to have received the rest of southern England, below the river Trent.

Later in 1405 Percy supported Richard le Scrope, Archbishop of York, in another rebellion, after which Percy fled to Scotland, and his estates were confiscated by the king.

In 1408 Percy invaded England in rebellion once more and was killed at the Battle of Bramham Moor. His severed head was subsequently put on display at London Bridge.

Marriages and issue

In 1358, he married Margaret Neville (12 February 133912 May 1372), daughter of Ralph Neville, 2nd Baron Neville de Raby, and Alice de Audley. They had four sons (Harry "Hotspur" Percy, Thomas, Ralph, and Alan) and one daughter (Margaret).

In 1381, he married Maud Lucy (134318 December 1398), daughter of Sir Thomas de Lucy, 2nd Baron Lucy, and Margaret de Multon, and thus sister and heiress of Anthony Lucy, 3rd Baron Lucy (died 1368), of Cockermouth Castle, Cumbria, which estate he inherited on condition that he and his heirs male should bear the arms of Lucy (Gules, three lucies hauriant argent) quarterly with their own. They had no issue.

In literature and media 

Northumberland is a major character in Shakespeare's Richard II, Henry IV, part 1, and Henry IV, part 2.

His position as a character in the Shakespearean canon inspired the character of Lord Percy Percy, heir to the duchy of Northumberland in the historical sitcom The Black Adder, set during the very late Plantagenet era.

The novel Lion of Alnwick by Carol Wensby-Scott is the first volume of the Percy Saga trilogy which retells the story of "the wild and brilliant Percy family" and relates a fictionalised account of the lives of the 1st Earl of Northumberland and his son Henry "Hotspur" Percy.  The other novels in the trilogy, Lion Dormant and Lion Invincible tell the story of his other descendants and their role in the English War of the Roses.

Henry Percy and his son Hotspur are also essential characters in Edith Pargeter's novel, A Bloody Field by Shrewsbury which recounts the events leading up to the Battle of Shrewsbury in 1403.

He is a major character in My Lord John by Georgette Heyer.

Ancestry

References

Sources
Rymer, Thomas Foedera, The Hague, 1739 
Beltz, G.F. Memorials of the most noble Order of the Garter, from its foundation to the present time London 1841 
Doyle, J.W.E, The Official Baronage of England London 1886 
Jean Froissart, Chronicles

Further reading 
Towson, Kris Henry Percy, first earl of Northumberland : ambition, conflict and cooperation in late mediaeval England St Andrews PhD Thesis, 2005.
Rose, Alexander Kings in the North – The House of Percy in British History. Phoenix/Orion Books Ltd, 2002,  (722 pages paperback)

1341 births
1408 deaths
14th-century English Navy personnel
14th-century English nobility
15th-century English nobility
1
English admirals
English military personnel killed in action
Percy, Henry, 1st Earl of Northumberland
Garter Knights appointed by Edward III
Monarchs of the Isle of Man
Henry Percy, 01 Earl of Northumberland
Percy, Henry, 1st Earl of Northumberland
High Sheriffs of Northumberland
Male Shakespearean characters
Monarchs killed in action